The St. Catharines Teepees were a junior ice hockey team in the Ontario Hockey Association from 1947 to 1962. The team was based in St. Catharines, Ontario, Canada.

History
The St. Catharines Teepees were born in 1947 when local businessman George Stauffer, president and GM of Thompson Products Ltd., purchased the St. Catharines Falcons team for $2500 from Rudy Pilous and named the team after the company's initials.

During the fifteen years the Teepees played, they developed into a powerhouse in the OHA. St. Catharines finished in first place five years in a six-year span, and won the league championship twice. The team also produced five league leading scorers and three MVPs in the same period. The Teepees won the Memorial Cup in both 1954 and 1960.

In 1961-62 the Teepees, no longer owned by Thompson Products, were in financial trouble and the Chicago Black Hawks came to their rescue. In 1962–63, the Teepees became the St. Catharines Black Hawks and would remain so until the team moved to Niagara Falls for the 1976–77 season.

1954 Memorial Cup
St. Catharines, still coached by Rudy Pilous, won the right to play for the Cup by defeating the Toronto Marlboros in seven games for the OHA championship, and the Quebec Frontenacs to win the Richardson Trophy as eastern Canadian representatives. The Teepees won the Memorial Cup in 1954 played at Maple Leaf Gardens. They defeated the Edmonton Oil Kings 4 games to 0 with one tie game, in a best-of-seven series.

1960 Memorial Cup
St. Catharines was now coached by Max Kaminsky and Rudy Pilous was the team manager for the 1960 Memorial Cup rematch versus the Edmonton Oil Kings. On the road to the Cup, the Teepees defeated the Toronto St. Michael's Majors for the OHA championship, and the Brockville Canadiens to win the Richardson Trophy as eastern Canadian representatives. The series against Brockville was decided in the 8th game after each team had won three games each with a tie game.

The 1960 Memorial Cup opened up at the Garden City Arena with remaining games played at Maple Leaf Gardens. The Teepees defeated the Edmonton Oil Kings for the second time in the Memorial Cup, 4 games to 2 in a best-of-seven series.

Championships
The St. Catharines Teepees are one of a few clubs to win multiple Memorial Cup championships. In total the Teepees won the Memorial Cup, the George Richardson Memorial Trophy, the J. Ross Robertson Cup and the Hamilton Spectator Trophy twice each.

Memorial Cup
 1954 Champions vs. Edmonton Oil Kings
 1960 Champions vs. Edmonton Oil Kings

George Richardson Memorial Trophy
 1954 Champions vs. Quebec Frontenacs
 1960 Champions vs. Brockville Canadiens

J. Ross Robertson Cup
 1952 Lost to Guelph Biltmore Mad Hatters
 1954 OHA Champions vs. Toronto Marlboros
 1955 Lost to Toronto Marlboros
 1957 Lost to Guelph Biltmore Mad Hatters
 1960 OHA Champions vs. St. Michael's Majors

Hamilton Spectator Trophy
 1957-1958 70 points (32 wins, 6 ties)
 1958-1959 83 points (40 wins, 3 ties)

Players
There have been 54 Teepees alumni play in the NHL. Four of those would be inducted into the Hockey Hall of Fame. St. Catharines also had three MVPs and five scoring champions with a six-year span.

Award winners

Red Tilson Trophy(Most Outstanding Player)
1953-54 - Brian Cullen
1954-55 - Hank Ciesla
1958-59 - Stan Mikita

Eddie Powers Memorial Trophy(Scoring Champion)
1953-54 - Brian Cullen
1954-55 - Hank Ciesla
1957-58 - John McKenzie
1958-59 - Stan Mikita
1959-60 - Chico Maki

Hall of Famers
Rudy Pilous

NHL alumni

Yearly results
Regular Season

Playoffs
Complete results prior to 1960 are currently unavailable.
1960-61 Lost to St. Michael's Majors 8 points to 4 in quarter-finals.
1961-62 Lost to Hamilton Red Wings 9 points to 3 in OHA semi-finals.

Arena
The St. Catharines Teepees played in the Garden City Arena in downtown St. Catharines, Ontario from 1947 to 1962, as did their predecessors the Falcons.

References

Defunct Ontario Hockey League teams
Sport in St. Catharines